Parataenius is a genus of aphodiine dung beetles in the family Scarabaeidae. There are about six described species in Parataenius.

Species
These six species belong to the genus Parataenius:
 Parataenius brunneus (Schmidt, 1922)
 Parataenius derbesis (Solier, 1851)
 Parataenius estero Stebnicka & Skelley, 2009
 Parataenius martinezi Stebnicka & Skelley, 2009
 Parataenius selvae Stebnicka & Skelley, 2009
 Parataenius simulator (Harold, 1868)

References

Further reading

 
 
 

Scarabaeidae
Articles created by Qbugbot